The Tsirku Glacier is a large icefield in the Saint Elias Mountains, spanning the border between British Columbia and Alaska, to the south of the Jarvis Glacier. It is the source of the Tsirku River, which flows northwest to become the second-largest tributary of the Chilkat River.

Name
The name is Tlingit in origin, first published by both the United States and Canada in 1923.

References

Canada–United States border
Glaciers of Alaska
Glaciers of British Columbia
Glaciers of Haines Borough, Alaska
Saint Elias Mountains